St. Boniface Church, or variants thereof, may refer to:

Belgium 
St. Boniface Church, Antwerp

Germany 
 St. Boniface's Church, Bergen
 St. Bonifatius, Kassel
 Saint Boniface (Paderborn)
 St. Bonifatius, Wiesbaden

Netherlands 
 Saint Boniface church, Leeuwarden

South Africa 
 St Boniface Church, Germiston

United Kingdom 
 St Boniface Church, Bonchurch
 Old St Boniface Church, Bonchurch
 St Boniface's Church, Bunbury

United States 
 St. Boniface Catholic Church (Fulda, Indiana)
 St. Boniface Church (Clinton, Iowa)
 Saint Boniface Church (New Vienna, Iowa)
 St. Boniface Catholic Church (Sioux City, Iowa)
 St. Boniface Catholic Church (Westphalia, Iowa)
 St. Boniface Roman Catholic Church, Detroit, Michigan
 Church of St. Boniface (Melrose, Minnesota), now the Church of St. Mary
 St. Boniface Roman Catholic Church (Perryville, Missouri), a former church
 St. Boniface Church (New York City)
 St. Boniface Church (Sublimity, Oregon)
 St. Boniface Roman Catholic Church (Pittsburgh, Pennsylvania)
 St. Boniface Church, Convent and Rectory, Uniontown, Washington